Í Blóði og Anda (English: "In Blood and Spirit") is the first full-length album by Sólstafir. The track Í Víking samples dialog from the film When the Raven Flies.

Track listing
"Undir Jökli" (Under The Glacier) – 4:36
"Í Blóði Og Anda" (In Blood And Spirit) – 4:30
"The Underworld Song" – 4:20
"Tormentor" – 2:02
"2000 Ár" (2000 Years) – 4:17
"Ei Við Munum Iðrast" (We Will Repent) – 9:04
"Bitch in Black" – 8:28
"Í Víking" – 9:03
"Árstíðir Dauðans" (Seasons Of Death) – 10:33

References

2002 albums
Sólstafir albums